Paul Blart: Mall Cop is a 2009 American action comedy film directed by Steve Carr, written by Kevin James and Nick Bakay, and produced by James, Adam Sandler, Jack Giarraputo, Todd Garner, and Barry Bernardi. It stars James as the titular character Paul Blart, with Jayma Mays and Raini Rodriguez in supporting roles. The film tells a story of Blart, a single dad and bumbling mall security guard, who finds himself in the middle of a heist and the only one in position to rescue hostages.

Filming began in February 2008 with a majority of the shooting taking place at the Burlington Mall in Burlington, Massachusetts. Produced by Adam Sandler's Happy Madison Productions in association with Relativity Media, Paul Blart: Mall Cop was released in the United States on January 16, 2009, by Sony Pictures Releasing through its Columbia Pictures label. The film was poorly received by critics but grossed $183.3 million worldwide against a production budget of $26 million. A sequel titled Paul Blart: Mall Cop 2 was released in 2015.

Plot

Paul Blart lives in West Orange, New Jersey with his young daughter Maya and his mother. Aspiring to join the New Jersey State Police, he trains at the police academy, but his hypoglycemia causes him to collapse before finishing the exam. Blart works as a security guard at the West Orange Pavilion Mall.

Blart patrols the mall on a Segway and begins training Veck Simms, a new hire who shows little interest in the job. Meanwhile, Blart becomes acquainted with Amy Anderson, a vendor of a new kiosk. Paul meets her one evening at a restaurant with other mall employees. Things initially go well, but when Blart participates in a nacho-eating contest with his friend Leon, the jalapeño peppers are too spicy for him and he chugs two glasses of margarita, mistaking it for lemonade. He gets drunk and makes a wild exit by falling through a window.

Two days later on the night of Black Friday, an organized gang of thugs disguised as Santa's Village employees begin a heist inside the mall. They take Amy and others inside a bank hostage, and Simms is revealed as the gang’s leader. The crew force the majority of shoppers to exit the mall and place motion sensors at each entrance to detect any attempt to enter or exit the building.

Blart is oblivious as he plays Rock Band before walking back into the mall to discover that it is nearly empty. He calls the police and plans to leave the mall, but he realizes that Amy is still inside and returns to the mall to look for her. A SWAT team arrives with commander James Kent at the helm. Kent, a former classmate and bully from Blart's childhood, takes control of the police units and orders Blart to let them handle the situation. Blart refuses and attempts a rescue. Vastly outnumbered, he takes a stand against Simms' crew, improvising to take them down one by one. He discovers credit-card codes written in invisible ink on the burglars' arms, realizing that their plans go beyond robbing the bank.

Maya, unaware of what is happening, shows up at the mall to bring Blart some food, but Simms' henchmen seize her and add her to the hostages. Blart manages to subdue all of Simms' accomplices and attempts to rescue the hostages by pulling them up into the air vent. The plan fails when Leon does not fit. Simms enters the room, capturing Blart and forcing him to give up the credit card codes recorded on his cell phone. Simms flees, taking Amy and Maya with him. As the SWAT team raids the mall, Blart borrows a display minivan with Kent, pursuing Simms to the airport, where he is attempting to escape to the Cayman Islands.

After a brief scuffle, Blart overpowers Simms and puts him in handcuffs. Moments later, however, Kent pulls his gun on Blart, revealing that he was working with Simms. Kent demands the phone containing the codes from Blart, who refuses and destroys the phone. Before Kent can retaliate by shooting Blart, Chief Brooks of the mall security team arrives and shoots Kent in the arm. Kent and Simms are arrested, and Amy and Maya are returned safely. For his bravery and assistance, Howard offers Blart a job with the New Jersey State Police. Blart declines, preferring to remain in mall security. Blart and Amy are eventually married in the mall, where they exchange vows on a set of black and white Segways.

Cast

Production

Production began in late February 2008 in Boston. Principal photography took place at the Burlington Mall in Burlington, Massachusetts after being denied a permit from Willowbrook Mall in Wayne, New Jersey. From late February until mid-April, the mall and its stores were decorated with Christmas decorations, and there was a large prop ball-pit in the main foyer of the mall near the Sears branch, and a Santa's Village at the opposite end near the Macy's branch where the mall usually puts its own Santa's Village. Interior filming took place mostly at night. Some of the aerial stunts, such as Blart being attacked in the scenic elevator, were performed at the South Shore Plaza in Braintree, MA, as the Burlington Mall's construction did not allow for some of these stunts.

Reception

Critical reception
On Rotten Tomatoes, Paul Blart: Mall Cop has an approval rating of 34% based on 117 reviews, with an average rating of 4.60/10. The website's critical consensus states "Paul Blart: Mall Cop has some laughs, but its plot is flimsy and lacking in any sustained comic momentum." On Metacritic, the film has a score of 39 out of 100, based on review from 24 critics, indicating "generally unfavorable reviews". Audiences surveyed by CinemaScore gave the film a grade B on scale of A to F.

Peter Travers of Rolling Stone gave the film one star out of four, panning the concept and juvenile humor. Variety's Brian Lowry called it "An almost shockingly amateurish one-note-joke comedy." James Berardinelli was also unimpressed by the juvenile tone, but praised the character of Paul Blart and a refreshing change from Adam Sandler's typical films calling it "a passable choice for watching at home, when viewers tend to be less demanding." Roger Ebert of the Chicago Sun-Times gave it three stars out of four, praising the film's "wholesome" comedy. Nathan Rabin of The A.V. Club gave the film a grade C−, calling it "a shamelessly sentimental comedy with a few crude gags thrown in arbitrarily" which "turns into a stale riff on Die Hard."

Box office
The film ranked #1 at the domestic box office with $9,791,368 from 3,144 theaters for an opening day average of $3,105. During the film's entire three-day opening weekend, the film remained at the top spot, grossing a total of $31,832,636, with a per screen average of $10,125, outgrossing its $26 million budget. It grossed $39,234,238 over the entire four-day MLK weekend, for a four-day average of $12,479. The film was the second best opening of all-time for the MLK weekend, behind 2008's Cloverfield. The film stayed at number one in its second weekend, grossing another $21,623,182, dropping just 32%, and boosting the ten day income to $64,923,380. In its third weekend it dropped to second place with $13,872,751, a 36% decline from the last weekend, for an average of $4,327 from 3,206 theaters, bringing the seventeen day gross to $83,247,655. In its fourth weekend, it dropped to fifth place with $10,884,825, a drop of 22% from the last weekend, for an average of $3,435 from 3,169 theaters, and bringing the 24-day tally to $96,886,687. In its fifth weekend (President's Day weekend), it dropped to sixth place, making another $10,983,319 over the three-day span, actually increasing 1%, for an average of $3,704 from 2,965 theaters, and bringing the 31-day total to $109,787,819, having broken the $100 million mark on Friday February 13. Over the four-day President's Day weekend, it made $13,574,027 for an average of $4,578, and bringing the 32-day cume to $112,388,524. The film closed on Monday, May 25, 2009, with a final domestic gross of $146,336,178, with the three-day opening weekend making up 21.75% of the total gross (26.81% for the four-day opening weekend). The film had as of 2009 made $36,625,591 internationally, bringing the total worldwide gross to $183,293,131, against a modest $26 million budget.

Home media
Paul Blart: Mall Cop was released on DVD, Blu-ray, and UMD on May 19, 2009. The DVD sold 1,817,747 copies, making US $29,411,146 for the week of May 24, 2009, having only been out for six days, and it ranked No. 1 for DVD sales that week as well. For the week of May 31, 2009, it again made No. 1 on the US DVD Charts as it sold an additional 553,681 copies and making US $9,921,964 for a total of 2,834,826 units sold with earnings of US $46,676,902 as of November 1, 2009. As of November 1, 2009, when combined with box office results and total DVD sales, the film has grossed a total of US $227,126,523.

Sequel

Sony expressed interest in producing a sequel to the film in January 2009. In early 2014, it was confirmed that the studio was moving forward, and shooting began in April 2014. Andy Fickman was hired to direct the sequel, while Kevin James co-wrote the script with Nick Bakay and returned to star in the leading role. The sequel was called Paul Blart: Mall Cop 2 and released on April 17, 2015.

See also
 Observe and Report
 Twin films

References

External links

 
 
 
 
 

2000s English-language films
2009 action comedy films
2009 comedy films
2009 films
American action comedy films
Braintree, Massachusetts
Burlington, Massachusetts
Columbia Pictures films
Films about security and surveillance
Films directed by Steve Carr
Films produced by Adam Sandler
Films set in New Jersey
Films set in shopping malls
Films shot in Massachusetts
Films with screenplays by Kevin James
Happy Madison Productions films
Mass media in Middlesex County, Massachusetts
Mass media in Norfolk County, Massachusetts
Mass media in Suffolk County, Massachusetts
Relativity Media films
West Orange, New Jersey
2000s American films